Fwix is a local information company for developers and media publishers. The mission of the company is to index the Web by location, specifically by organizing content on the Web by latitude and longitude coordinates.  Fwix aggregates, in real-time, the news, events, status-updates, photos, reviews, places, and other social media in your city.

After a two years internship at Facebook, Daren Shirazi decided to found his own company Fwix in 2008.

Pivot to Radius 
In April 2012, the company announced it had rebranded the company as Radius Intelligence and changed its business model.

References

External links
Original website
Rebranded website

See also
Location-based service

Companies based in California